The Lendl–McEnroe rivalry was a tennis rivalry between Ivan Lendl and John McEnroe, who met in 36 matches between 1980 and 1992. Their head-to-head is 21–15, favoring Lendl. It is one of the most notable tennis rivalries of the Open Era. Their most memorable match was at the 1984 French Open, when Lendl came from two sets down to win the championship.

Playing Styles : 

McEnroe, although capable of holding his own from the back court against most players - he struggled against Lendl. Thus would use every opportunity to get to the net and take time away from Lendl who was not the fastest mover and had loopier swings - which on faster surfaces did not serve him as well as say, clay.

John had to make sure he served a variety of spins, speed and placements to keep Ivan guessing and adjusting.  Lendl on the other hand had a possibly simpler game plan: serve hard enough to keep McEnroe back and then pound away with his powerful topspin groundies.

As both pushed the other to evolve - John adopted the Max200G to help him add muscle to his arsenal, whereas Ivan hired a nutritionist, fitness advisor and Tony Roach as his coach to improve his known weaknesses : 2nd serve, backhand and volleys.

In the end, it was more a matter of dedication that ability that made the head-to-head lean in Lendl's favour, however - when they were on - it was fireworks all day.

Head-to-head

Official matches (36)

Lendl 21 – McEnroe 15

Note: WEA indicates a match canceled due to weather. There was no result in this final.

Breakdown of their rivalry 
All matches: (36)  Lendl 21–15
All finals: (18)* McEnroe 10–7,   *(1 No Result)
Grand Slam finals: Lendl 2–1
Grand Slam matches: Lendl 7–3
Masters matches: Lendl 3–2
WCT Finals matches: McEnroe 2–1
Davis Cup matches: Lendl 1–0
Other tournament matches: Tied 8–8

Other matches

Invitational matches

Lendl–McEnroe (16–11)

ATP rankings

Year-end ranking timeline

See also
Connors–McEnroe rivalry
Connors–Lendl rivalry
Borg–McEnroe rivalry
List of tennis rivalries

References

John McEnroe
Tennis rivalries
Sports rivalries in the United States